Greatest Hits is a compilation album by American rock band Bon Jovi, released on October 29, 2010.

The standard edition of the album includes 14 of the band's hits and two brand new singles "What Do You Got?" and "No Apologies".

A double disc version entitled Greatest Hits – The Ultimate Collection was also released featuring a second disc of fan favorites along with two more new songs: "This Is Love, This Is Life" and "The More Things Change".

The new songs were written specifically for this new compilation project. The font used for the band's name on the album's cover is a return to the Bon Jovi logo used from 1985 to 1988 and it is also the first ever album to use the heart and dagger logo.

Bon Jovi performed a special, live streaming concert for the Live on Letterman web series on November 9, 2010. The band performed a significant part of the album during the hour-long set.

Commercial performance
In the United States the album debuted and peaked at number five on the Billboard 200 the week of November 27, 2010 with 88,000 copies sold, exceeding the first week sales of the band's 1994 hits collection, Cross Road, which sold 84,000 units in its debut week, the next week it dropped to number eighteen; it remained on the chart for eighty five weeks. Additionally, it topped the Top Rock Albums and Top Hard Rock Albums charts. It was certified platinum by the RIAA on February 25, 2015, for shipments of one million.

In the United Kingdom the album entered and peaked at number two on November 13, 2010, selling 87,000 copies, it stayed at number two for two weeks and fell off to number six on its third week on chart; it was present on the chart for one hundred eighty three weeks. It was certified three times platinum by the BPI on January 2, 2015, denoting shipments of one million seven hundred units.

The album also opened at number one in Portugal, Ireland and on the European Top 100 Albums chart, additionally, it debuted at number two in Germany and Austria and at number five in Norway.

Singles
The new single, "What Do You Got?" hit radio airwaves globally August 26, 2010 and was released as a digital download on September 21, 2010. The band later confirmed that "No Apologies" will be a single. It was released on October 22, 2010, on the band website. A music video was made while performing in Australia. "This Is Our House" was released as a promo single.

Track listing
The full track listing of the American and Canadian versions of compilation albums was unveiled on the official Bon Jovi website, which also offered the exclusive MP3 download of the new song "This Is Our House".

North American edition

International edition

Japanese edition

Release details
While the standard edition released in North America will have 28 tracks, the Australian and Japanese editions are set to have 30 and 31 tracks respectively. There are a few differences between the North American track list and the international track list. The main difference is the inclusion of "In and Out of Love" and "I'll Sleep When I'm Dead". Other differences include tracks from Keep the Faith album being present on disc 1 instead of disc 2, and "Blaze of Glory" being present on disc 2 instead of disc 1. The only album by the band not represented on either version of the compilation is Bounce.

The iTunes Store includes one additional track for the standard album download which is "This Is Our House" which was released as a digital single and given additionally as a pre-order-only track was "Raise Your Hands (NMS Live – 2010)". On the ultimate collection edition of the iTunes download, "This Is Our House" is included followed by the music video for "What Do You Got", a 10-minute track-by-track video interview, a digital booklet and given additionally as pre-order-only tracks were "Raise Your Hands (NMS Live – 2010)" and "Blood on Blood (NMS Live – 2010)".

Amazon UK and France lists "It's My Life (NMS Live – 2010)" as a bonus track on the standard digital edition, while Nokia's Ovi store in the United Kingdom and Ireland adds "When We Were Beautiful (NMS Live – 2010)" to both the standard and deluxe digital editions. Australia's BigPond Music and various European digital editions add "Keep the Faith (NMS Live – 2010)".

The Swedish DRM-based music streaming service Spotify got an exclusive single for unlimited & premium members, including Wanted Dead Or Alive, Livin' On A Prayer and Born To Be My Baby all tracks recorded live at the New Meadowlands Stadium in May 2010.

Personnel
Jon Bon Jovi – lead vocals, guitar
Richie Sambora – lead guitar, backing vocals
Tico Torres – drums, percussion
David Bryan – keyboards, backing vocals
Alec John Such – bass, backing vocals
 Hugh McDonald – bass guitar, backing vocals

Charts

Weekly charts

Year-end charts

Decade-end charts

Certifications and sales

Release history

Rock Band 3 promotion
Twelve songs from the Greatest Hits album were also released as downloadable content for music video game Rock Band 3 on November 9, 2010. The pack features every song from the first disc of the North American album except "Born to Be My Baby", "Always", "What Do You Got?" and "No Apologies". It also includes the full-length version of "Lay Your Hands on Me", and not the radio edit featured on Greatest Hits.

References

2010 greatest hits albums
Bon Jovi compilation albums
Island Records compilation albums